Phra Borom Maha Ratchawang is a khwaeng (subdistrict) of Phra Nakhon District, in Bangkok, Thailand. In 2017 it had a total population of 3,953 people.

History
The subdistrict was named after the Grand Palace or Phra Borom Maha Ratchawang in Thai, which is located within the subdistrict.

When Somdet Chaophraya Maha Kasatsuek established himself as a King Rama I, after the death of King Taksin, he moved the capital of Siam (now Thailand) to the right side of Chao Phraya River opposite to the former capital, Thonburi. He then built a new palace along with the establishment of the Rattanakosin Kingdom officially on April 21, 1782.

Geography
Phra Borom Maha Ratchawang can be considered a western part of the district and the main administrative area of the district.

The area is bordered by many subdistricts (from north clockwise): Chana Songkhram, Talat Yot, Bowon Niwet, San Chaopho Suea, Wat Ratchabophit, Wang Burapha Phirom all in its district, and Wat Kanlaya in Thon Buri District, Wat Arun in Bangkok Yai District, Siriraj, and Arun Amarin in Bangkok Noi District (across Chao Phraya River).

References

Subdistricts of Bangkok
Phra Nakhon district
Populated places on the Chao Phraya River